Thapsagus is a monotypic genus of East African sheet weavers containing the single species, Thapsagus pulcher. It was first described by Eugène Louis Simon in 1894, and has only been found on Madagascar.

See also
 List of Linyphiidae species (Q–Z)

References

Linyphiidae
Monotypic Araneomorphae genera
Spiders of Madagascar